Kenneth Roderick O'Neal (1908–1989), was an American architect, engineer, and painter. He founded the first Black-owned and led architecture firm in downtown Chicago. O'Neal had studied under Ludwig Mies van der Rohe, and served as a mentor for early career architects including Beverly Lorraine Greene, John Moutoussamy, and Georgia Louise Harris Brown.

Biography  
Kenneth Roderick O'Neal was born on July 30, 1908 in Union, Franklin County, Missouri. He attended Sumner High School in St. Louis. 

O'Neal graduated with a B.A. degree (1931) in graphic design, and a B.S. degree (1935) in structural engineering from University of Iowa. After graduation he moved to Chicago to attend classes at Armour Institute (now Illinois Institute of Technology), studying under Ludwig Mies van der Rohe.

In his early career, O'Neal worked under Walter T. Bailey. He opened the first Black-led architecture firm in downtown Chicago, and by 1940 he was a licensed architect in the state of Illinois. In 1937, Beverly Lorraine Greene had briefly worked for O'Neal's architecture firm, and he had served as one of her mentors. Georgia Louise Harris Brown, the second African American woman to become a licensed architect in the United States, had also worked at the firm of O'Neal from 1945 to 1949. Architect John Moutoussamy had also been mentored by O'Neal and worked at the firm. O'Neal published two design books: "A Portfolio of Modern Homes" (1949), and "A Volume of Contemporary Homes" (1980). 

He retired in 1983. O'Neal had married three times. After retirement he moved to Tucson, Arizona, followed by a move to Honolulu, Hawaii. He died at age 80 on March 17, 1989, in Honolulu.

Work 

 Lawrence E. Smith residence (1964), 8348 South Calumet, Chicago, Illinois

Publications

See also 

 African-American architects

References 

1908 births
1989 deaths
People from Union, Missouri
University of Iowa alumni
Illinois Institute of Technology alumni
African-American architects
African-American painters
Architects from Chicago
20th-century African-American artists
People from Honolulu